Illinois Route 104 is a state highway in central and western Illinois. It extends from Illinois Route 29 near Taylorville, west over the Illinois River at Meredosia to its western terminus in downtown Quincy.

Route description 

Illinois 104 crosses Interstate 55 at Exit 82 near Pawnee, and crosses Interstate 172 at Exit 14 near Quincy.  The road also crosses Interstate 72 near Jacksonville, but there is no interchange at this crossing.

Illinois 104 doubles as the primary east–west street within the municipality of Quincy, Illinois.  Called Broadway Street, the highway carries traffic up and down the Mississippi River bluffs that divide the city.

In Jacksonville, Illinois 104 intersects the new U.S. Route 67 Jacksonville Bypass and follows portions of the new Business U.S. 67 through the city. Northwest of the city, Illinois 104 and U.S. 67 are concurrent for 13 miles (21 km).

Points of interest 
Points of interest along the road include:

Illinois College, Jacksonville, Ill., one of the oldest colleges in Illinois (1829) .
Quincy National Cemetery, Quincy, Ill. (1870); 582 interments, including 221 Union soldiers buried before 1882 .

History 
Prior to 1937, Illinois 104 had run from Mount Sterling on what is now Illinois Route 99 to Taylorville on modern Illinois 104. After 1937, the route took its current routing.

Major Intersections

References

External links

104
Transportation in Adams County, Illinois
Transportation in Pike County, Illinois
Transportation in Morgan County, Illinois
Transportation in Sangamon County, Illinois
Transportation in Christian County, Illinois